The Initiative for the Science of the Human Past at Harvard (SoHP) is a trans-disciplinary research endeavor aimed at combining next-generation technology and scientific research with established methods of historical investigation. The Initiative currently sponsors four major projects:
1) The History of Climate Change (historical ice core project), in collaboration with the Climate Change Institute (University of Maine).
2) The Max Planck Harvard Research Center for the Archaeoscience of the Ancient Mediterranean (MHAAM), in collaboration with the Max Planck Institute for the Science of Human History.
3) The Isotopic Silk Road.
4) The Digital Atlas of Roman and Medieval Civilizations (DARMC) combining highly detailed data from researchers worldwide.

SoHP addresses long-standing, crucial questions that have eluded historians and archaeologists due to lack of evidence. SoHP members combine the latest technology and scientific research—producing unprecedented amounts of high-quality data about the past—to take full advantage of the potential of interdisciplinary work. The Initiative's publications have so far shed light on topics of current as well as historical relevance, such as the spread and evolution of the deadliest epidemics (e.g. Yersinia pestis); the true (man-made) level of lead pollution in the air; trade and migration patterns across Eurasia and the Mediterranean.

The steering committee of the Initiative includes: Thomas Benjamin, Joyce Chaplin, Peter Huybers, Michael McCormick (Chair), Laura Nasrallah, Nick Patterson, David Pilbeam, David Reich, Stuart Shieber, Dan Smail, Christina Warriner, Jason Ur, Walter Willett. The initiative sponsors postdoctoral fellowships for outstanding interdisciplinary scholars in the new fields of archaeoscience, health history and climate history. The current postdoctoral fellow is Alexander F. More who is also Assistant Research Professor at the Climate Change Institute. SoHP has also started sponsoring a PhD in archaeoscience, selecting candidates at a yearly symposium held at Harvard University during the fall semester. Candidates are selected from all over the world among the most promising researchers combining scientific and historical methods to investigate the past.

References

External links

 Official website of the Initiative for the Science of the Human Past at Harvard
 Max Planck Institute for the Science of Human History

Harvard University